Barkat is a surname and a given name. Notable persons with that name include:

Persons with the given name
Barkat Gourad Hamadou (born 1930), Djibouti politician and Prime Minister
Barkat Siddiqui, Pakistani television director, producer and actor
Barkat Sidhu (1946–2014), Indian Punjabi singer
Barkat Virani, Indian Gujarati author and poet

Persons with the surname
Abul Barkat (1927–1952), Bengali-Pakistani demonstrator killed during protests
Abul Barkat (economist) (born 1954), Bangladeshi economist and professor
Alona Barkat (born 1969), Israeli businesswoman and football team owner
Behzad Barkat, Iranian translator and professor
Nir Barkat (born 1959), Israeli businessman, entrepreneur, philanthropist; two-term mayor of Jerusalem
Reuven Barkat (1906–1972), Israeli politician
Sidi Mohamed Barkat (born 1948), Algerian philosopher
Waqas Barkat (born 1990), Pakistani-born Hong Kong cricketer

See also

Barkat Ali, male Muslim given name
Shaheed Barkat Stadium, Gazipur, Bangladesh
Barakat (disambiguation)
Bereket (disambiguation)